"Catch Us If You Can" is a 1965 song from The Dave Clark Five, written by group's drummer Dave Clark and guitarist Lenny Davidson. It was the title song for the film of the same name, which was retitled Having a Wild Weekend in the United States. The single reached number five in the UK and number four in the US.

Background
Starting with guitar and finger snapping accompaniment, the hook was instantaneous:

Here they come again, mmmm-mm-mm
Catch us if you can, mmmm-mm-mm
Time to get a move on, mmmm-mm-mm
We will yell with all of our might!
 [drums kick in]
Catch us if you can ...

It served as the title song to John Boorman's well-regarded 1965 DC5 vehicle and pop scene film Catch Us If You Can (retitled Having a Wild Weekend in the U.S.). The title phrase was seemingly a take-off on the 1959 crime film Catch Me If You Can and similar phrases, with "me" turned to the group's "us".

Reception
Cash Box described it as a "rollicking, fast-moving rocker with a contagious, funky rhythmic undercurrent," saying it could be a "blockbuster."

Chart performance
The song was one of DC5's top hits, reaching number 5 on the UK Singles Chart in the late summer of 1965, and number 4 on the U.S. pop singles chart, later that fall.

In the U.S., "Catch" remains one of the DC5's most played tunes on oldies radio stations. Billboard described the song as a "pulsating rocker."

Cover versions
Given the song's significance to Shrewsbury Town F.C. – the club's fans consider it Shrewsbury's theme song – a local Shropshire band, Hello Cleveland, and Shrewsbury fans released a cover version in 2011, with a percentage of the proceeds going to children's charity Hope House. The song was made available for purchase on Amazon and on the club's official shop webpage.

Popular culture
On and off since the 1974-1975 season, "Catch Us If You Can" has been played near the start of Shrewsbury Town F.C. matches as the footballers run onto the pitch; the song is thus seen by home fans as Shrewsbury's de facto theme tune and is commonly sung by fans at matches.
In Australia, the Candid Camera-style television show Catch Us If You Can was named after the song. 
Author Emlyn Williams used this song's lyric as an epigraph in Beyond Belief: A Chronicle of Murder and its Detection, his book about the serial killers Ian Brady and Myra Hindley. "Catch Us If You Can" was a hit song on British radio during part of the time the Moors murders were being committed.
The song, by then thirty years old, was also used in a 1995 Walkers advert, for their now-discontinued (but new at the time) crinkle-cut range, which featured three flavours: Cream Cheese & Chive, Cheese & Ham, and Roast Beef & Mustard; the song seemed appropriate as it was saying "catch us crinkle cut crisps if you can". (The off-screen voice-over, as in all of Walkers' crisps commercials then, was by Hugh Laurie.)
The song was also featured in the opening sequence of the ESPN broadcast of the 1989 Winston 500 NASCAR race, held at Talladega Superspeedway.
"Catch Us If You Can" was also used for video clips of baseball highlights on The George Michael Sports Machine.
The song was also used in the opening sequence of the TBS broadcast of the 1987 NBA Playoffs, between the Los Angeles Lakers against the Seattle SuperSonics, in Game 2 of the Western Conference Finals.
It is also used in the opening credits of the 1990 movie Look Who's Talking Too, when baby Julie is conceived.
It was covered by the Mattel character Barbie in the 1987 animated television special Barbie and the Rockers: Out of This World.

References

1965 singles
The Dave Clark Five songs
1965 songs
Songs written by Lenny Davidson
Songs written by Dave Clark (musician)
Columbia Graphophone Company singles